is a Japanese actor, screenwriter and film director. He grew up in Tōgō, Aichi District. He is represented with From First Production. He graduated from Shinshu University Faculty of Economics.

Filmography

TV drama

NHK

Nippon TV

Tokyo Broadcasting System

Fuji Television

TV Asahi

TV Tokyo

Wowow

To-Mei-Han Net 6

LaLa TV

Internet drama

Films

Animated films

Video games

Japanese dub

Variety series

Advertisements

Screenplays

TV series

Films

Bibliography

Awards

References

External links
  
 Official profile 

Japanese male actors
Japanese screenwriters
1969 births
Shinshu University alumni
Living people
Actors from Aichi Prefecture